is an annual award for serialized manga published in the previous year, the event is sponsored by the publisher Kodansha. It is currently awarded in three categories: shōnen, shōjo, and general. The awards began in 1977, initially with categories for shōnen and shōjo. The first award for the general category was in 1982, and the first children's category's award was in 2003. The children's category was merged into the shōnen and shōjo categories starting in 2015.

Each winning work will be honored with a bronze statuette, a certificate and a prize of 1 million yen (about US$7,500).

Recipients

See also
 List of manga awards

References

External links
 Japanese official website

 
Awards established in 1977
Manga awards
Comics awards
1977 establishments in Japan
Annual events in Japan